One Night Stand is a musical with a book and lyrics by Herb Gardner and music by Jule Styne. Its plot centers on a songwriter who feels he's past his prime.

Styne had approached Gardner about adapting his play A Thousand Clowns for the musical stage, but Gardner was more interested in working on an original project. According to producer Joe Kipness, the collaboration was ill-conceived, since the two men could not agree about anything. 

The Broadway production, directed by John Dexter and choreographed by Peter Gennaro, began previews at the Nederlander Theatre on October 20, 1980. After eight performances, it closed without ever officially opening. The cast included Charles Kimbrough, Catherine Cox, Jack Weston, and Brandon Maggart.

A cast album was released by Original Cast Records.

Song list

Act I
Everybody Loves Me
There Was a Time (Part I)
A Little Travellin' Music Please
Go Out Big
Someday Soon
For You
I Am Writing a Love Song

Act II
Gettin' Some
Somebody Stole My Kazoo
I Am Writing a Love Song (Reprise)
We Used to Talk Once
The 'Now' Dance
Long Way From Home
Too Old To Be So Young
Everybody Loves Me (Reprise)
There Was a Time (Part II)
Here Comes Never

References
Not Since Carrie: Forty Years of Broadway Musical Flops by Ken Mandelbaum, published by St. Martin's Press (1991), pages 117-18

External links
Internet Broadway Database entry

1980 musicals
Broadway musicals
Original musicals
Musicals by Jule Styne